The Portland Company was established 10 November 1846 by John A. Poor and Norris Locomotive Works engineer Septimus Norris as a locomotive foundry to build railroad equipment for the adjacent Portland terminus of the Atlantic and St. Lawrence Railroad connection between Portland, Maine and Montreal. The shops opened for business in October, 1847. Its first locomotive, the Augusta, emerged from the shops in July 1848 for delivery to the Portland, Saco & Portsmouth (later part of the Boston and Maine Railroad). Over the next several decades, the Company produced in its Fore Street facilities over 600 steam locomotives as well as 160 merchant and naval vessels, railcars, construction equipment, Knox automobiles, and the like. Taking into account its other products, the Company could lay claim to being one of the leading medium-to-heavy steel manufacturers in New England. The company ceased production in 1978.

Presently, according to The Portland Company Complex website, the site has become a marine-oriented complex with a small marina, several marine as well as other office tenants and the Maine Narrow Gauge Railroad Co. & Museum.

5'6"-gauge locomotives for the Atlantic and St. Lawrence Railroad

Two-Foot Gauge Locomotives 
In 1890, The Portland Company acquired patterns used by the Hinkley Locomotive Works for 2-foot gauge locomotives.  Portland improved the pattern into the most successful design on Maine's 2-foot gauge railroads.  The Portland design retained ornate Victorian features including capped domes and a cab roof with graceful reversing curvature.  The first of the design was the heaviest and most powerful locomotive on any of the Maine 2-foot gauge railroads at the time of delivery.  Portland locomotives became the standard for passenger service as larger freight engines were built.  Portland locomotives were subsequently used for yard service and on lines with lighter rail.  Portland Company was the dominant manufacturer of freight cars for the Maine 2-foot gauge railroads between 1890 and 1907.

The final 2-foot gauge locomotive built by The Portland Company was a less successful enlargement of the original design.  Vulcan Iron Works built two modernized versions of Portland's basic design for the Monson Railroad in 1913 and 1918 after Portland Company ceased manufacture of railway locomotives.  The basic Portland design pulled the last Kennebec Central Railroad train in 1929, the last Wiscasset, Waterville, and Farmington Railway train in 1933, and the last Monson Railroad train in 1943.

Preserved Portland locomotives
The following locomotives built by Portland have been preserved.

References

Notes

Archives and records
Portland Company records at Baker Library Special Collections, Harvard Business School.

External links
photos from 1949 made by Leyland Whipple, a talented photographer who worked there as a quality control technician

Defunct locomotive manufacturers of the United States
Defunct rolling stock manufacturers of the United States
History of Portland, Maine